The men's artistic individual all-around event was part of the gymnastics programme at the 1928 Summer Olympics. It was one of seven gymnastics events for men and was the seventh Olympic men's all-around gymnastic championship. Scores from the individual apparatus events were added to give aggregate scores for the individual all-around; individual all-around scores were similarly summed for the team all-around event. There were 88 competitors from 11 nations. Each nation sent a team of 8 gymnasts. The event was won by Georges Miez of Switzerland, with his countryman Hermann Hänggi taking silver. They were the first medals in the event for Swiss gymnasts since 1904 and the first gold medal ever for a Swiss man in the individual all-around. Defending Olympic champion Leon Štukelj of Yugoslavia finished with the bronze this time, making him the third man to win multiple medals in the event.

Background

This was the seventh appearance of the men's individual all-around. The first individual all-around competition had been held in 1900, after the 1896 competitions featured only individual apparatus events. A men's individual all-around has been held every Games since 1900.

Seven of the top 10 gymnasts from the 1924 Games returned: gold medalist Leon Štukelj of Yugoslavia, bronze medalist Bedřich Šupčík of Czechoslovakia, fourth-place finisher Ferdinando Mandrini of Italy, sixth-place finisher Ladislav Vácha of Czechoslovakia, seventh-place finisher August Güttinger of Switzerland, eighth-place finisher (and 1920 bronze medalist) Jean Gounot of France, and tenth-place finisher Mario Lertora of Italy. Reigning World Champion Peter Šumi of Yugoslavia did not compete in Amsterdam, but second-place finisher Josef Effenberger and third-place finisher Ladislav Vácha, both of Czechoslovakia, did.

For the first time, no nations made their debut in the event. France and Italy each made their sixth appearance, tied for most among nations, both having missed only the 1904 Games in St. Louis.

Competition format

By 1928, the format for the all-around competition had begun to settle after changing widely in the earlier Games. The 1924 Games (roughly following the precedent of 1904) used an aggregate score of the various apparatus events for an individual all-around championship; the 1928 tournament continued with that format. The rope climbing exercise was dropped, however. The 1928 all-around consisted of 10 exercises on 5 apparati. The compulsory and optional exercises for the parallel bars, horizontal bar, rings, and pommel horse were worth from 0 to 30 points each (with each apparatus from 0 to 60), while the compulsory (sidehorse) vault and optional (regular) vault exercises were worth from 0 to 15 points each (with 0 to 30 total for the vault competition). Thus, the total possible all-around score was 270.

Schedule

Results
Source: Official results; De Wael

References

Gymnastics at the 1928 Summer Olympics
Men's events at the 1928 Summer Olympics